Denis Vladimirovich Poyarkov (born 16 October 1989) is a Russian professional football player. He plays for FC Metallurg Lipetsk.

Club career
He made his Russian Football National League debut for FC Tambov on 11 July 2016 in a game against FC SKA-Khabarovsk.

External links
 

1989 births
People from Yefremovsky District
Living people
Russian footballers
Association football midfielders
FC Moscow players
FC Metallurg Lipetsk players
FC Sokol Saratov players
FC Tambov players
FC Khimki players
FC Mordovia Saransk players
FC Tom Tomsk players
FC Zhetysu players
Russian First League players
Russian Second League players
Kazakhstan Premier League players
Russian expatriate footballers
Expatriate footballers in Kazakhstan
Sportspeople from Tula Oblast